Kaltern an der Weinstraße, often abbreviated to Kaltern or Caldaro, is a municipality in South Tyrol in northern Italy.

Geography

It is famous for its lake, the Kalterer See, and wine (Kalterersee Auslese or Lago di Caldaro scelto). The cuisine combines Italian and Tyrolean styles. The nearby Dolomites area is known for its hiking and climbing routes.

Kaltern borders the following municipalities: Eppan, Neumarkt, Tramin, Vadena, Amblar, Cavareno, Ruffrè-Mendola, and Sarnonico (the last four municipalities belong to the Trentino).

Frazioni
The municipality of Kaltern contains the frazioni (subdivisions, mainly villages and hamlets) Altenburg (Castelvecchio), Oberplanitzing (Pianizza di Sopra), Unterplanitzing (Pianizza di Sotto), St. Josef am See (San Giuseppe al Lago), St. Anton/Pfuss (San Antonio/Pozzo), St. Nikolaus (San Nicoló) and Mitterdorf (Villa di Mezzo).

History

Coat-of-arms
The coat of arms, used by the end of the 16th century, is a copper kettle with a handle on argent background.

Society

Linguistic distribution
According to the 2011 census, 92.61% of the population speak German, 7.03% Italian and 0.36% Ladin as first language.

Demographic evolution

Twin towns — sister cities
Kaltern an der Weinstraße is twinned with:

  Heppenheim, Germany (1971)

Notable residents
 Manfred Fuchs (1938 in Latsch – 2014 in Kaltern) a German entrepreneur and space pioneer
 Andreas Seppi (born 1984) an Italian professional tennis player

Picture gallery

References

External links
  Homepage of the municipality

Municipalities of South Tyrol
Nonsberg Group